The 1985 Milwaukee Brewers season involved the Brewers finishing 6th in the American League East with a record of 71 wins and 90 losses.

Offseason
 December 7, 1984: Don Sutton was traded by the Brewers to the Oakland Athletics for Ray Burris, Eric Barry (minors), and a player to be named later. The Athletics completed the deal by sending Ed Myers (minors) to the Brewers on March 25, 1985.
 January 3, 1985: Steve Carter was drafted by the Milwaukee Brewers in the 3rd round of the 1985 amateur draft (January), but did not sign.
 January 8, 1985: Jim Kern was signed as a free agent by the Brewers.
 January 18, 1985: Jim Sundberg was traded by the Brewers to the Kansas City Royals as part of a 4-team trade. Danny Darwin and a player to be named later were traded by the Texas Rangers to the Brewers, and Tim Leary was traded by the New York Mets to the Brewers. Don Slaught was traded by the Kansas City Royals to the Rangers. Frank Wills was traded by the Royals to the Mets. The Rangers completed the trade by sending Bill Nance (minors) to the Brewers on January 30.
 April 3, 1985: Yutaka Enatsu was cut after a spring training tryout with the team at age 36.

Regular season

Season standings

Record vs. opponents

Notable transactions
 June 17, 1985: Jim Kern was released by the Brewers.

Draft picks
 June 3, 1985: B. J. Surhoff was drafted by the Brewers in the 1st round (1st pick) of the 1985 Major League Baseball draft.
 June 3, 1985: Steve Carter was drafted by the Milwaukee Brewers in the 3rd round of the 1985 amateur draft (June Secondary), but did not sign.

Roster

Player stats

Batting

Starters by position
Note: Pos = Position; G = Games played; AB = At bats; H = Hits; Avg. = Batting average; HR = Home runs; RBI = Runs batted in

Other batters
Note: G = Games played; AB = At bats; H = Hits; Avg. = Batting average; HR = Home runs; RBI = Runs batted in

Pitching

Starting pitchers 
Note: G = Games pitched; IP = Innings pitched; W = Wins; L = Losses; ERA = Earned run average; SO = Strikeouts

Other pitchers 
Note: G = Games pitched; IP = Innings pitched; W = Wins; L = Losses; ERA = Earned run average; SO = Strikeouts

Relief pitchers 
Note: G = Games pitched; W = Wins; L = Losses; SV = Saves; ERA = Earned run average; SO = Strikeouts

Farm system

The Brewers' farm system consisted of five minor league affiliates in 1985. The Vancouver Canadians won the Pacific Coast League championship.

Notes

References
1985 Milwaukee Brewers team at Baseball-Reference
1985 Milwaukee Brewers team page at www.baseball-almanac.com

Milwaukee Brewers seasons
Milwaukee Brewers season
Mil